The Niagara Parks Butterfly Conservatory is a butterfly house operated by the Niagara Parks Commission in Niagara Falls, Ontario, Canada.

The conservatory was opened in December 1996 with a gift shop, 200-seat theater/auditorium room, and a climate-controlled greenhouse. The conservatory has over 2,000 tropical butterflies from over 45 different species. The conservatory can accommodate up to 300 visitors per hour. Since captive butterflies usually have a life span of 2–4 weeks, the conservatory imports up to 3,000 butterflies per month from world butterfly farms in Costa Rica, El Salvador, the Philippines, and Australia. Special netting along the inside of the glass dome keeps the butterflies from getting stuck to it and from dying from hypothermia. Butterfly food plants at the conservatory such as Lantana, Cuphea, Zinnia, Ixora, Liatris, and Pentas are replaced every 2–3 weeks because caterpillars have large appetites.

Visitors who want the butterflies to land on them should wear bright clothes, move slowly, and wear perfume or cologne.   The Emergence area allows visitors to view the butterfly life cycle and produces over 45,000 butterflies annually.

The species of butterfly at the conservatory include the banded orange, blue morpho, common Mormon, cydno longwing, Doris longwing, Gulf fritillary, Julia, Low's swallowtail, monarch, mosaic, owl, red lacewing, Sara longwing, and small postman.

References

External links 

 

Butterfly houses
Culture of Niagara Falls, Ontario
Tourist attractions in Niagara Falls, Ontario
Niagara Parks Commission
1996 establishments in Ontario
Buildings and structures in Niagara Falls, Ontario
Aviaries in Canada
Zoos in Ontario